The Erasure Show – Live in Cologne is a DVD released by British synthpop duo Erasure which was a live concert from their sellout 2005 world tour, The Erasure Show.  The DVD was released by Mute Records in 2005 and contained not only the Cologne performance but also several live performances from the 2003 Other Tour, music videos from Nightbird and behind-the-scenes and interviews with Vince Clarke and Andy Bell about the show.

Track listing

Main Show
 "Intro (Rock a Bye Baby)"
 "No Doubt"
 "Hideaway"
 "Victim of Love"
 "Knocking on Your Door"
 "The Circus"
 "Breathe"
 "Ship of Fools"
 "Drama"
 "All This Time Still Falling Out of Love"
 "Stop!"
 "Rapture"
 "Ave Maria"
 "Breath of Life" 
 "A Little Respect"
 "I Broke It All in Two"
 "Chains of Love"
 "Chorus"
 "Love to Hate You"
 "Blue Savannah"
 "Always"
 "Who Needs Love (Like That)"
 "Oh L'amour"
 "I Bet You're Mad at Me"
 "Sometimes"

Extra features
 "In My Arms" (Live in Copenhagen))
 "Make Me Smile [Come Up and See Me]" (Live in Copenhagen)
 "Piano Song" (Live in Copenhagen)
 "Making of" featurette
 Interview with Andy and Vince
 Time Lapse
 "Breathe" (Video)
 "Don't Say You Love Me" (Video)
 "All This Time Still Falling Out Of Love" (Video)

Notes
UK Release Date: October 31, 2005
Front cover photography: Joel Huxtable
Design: Robert Ryan / This is Real Art
Recorded live: E Werk Stadium, Cologne on 28 March 2005.
Audio recorded by: Will Shapland for Will Shapland Mobiles and Live Here Now
Assisted by: Dave Loudoun and Chris Goddard
Mixed by: Will Shapland at The Instrument
Assisted by: David Dettori Williams & Dave Loudoun
Vocals by: Andy Bell
Programming, keyboards and acoustic guitar: Vince Clarke
Backing Vocals: Valerie Chalmers and Ann-Marie Gilkes
Costume Design: Dean Bright
Choreography: Les Child
Tour Manager: Andy Whittle
Set Technician: Nik Kennedy
Aspect Ratio: 16:9 Widescreen
Audio: Dolby Digital 5.1 Surround & PCM Stereo

Songwriting credits
Written by: Erasure
Published by: Musical Moments (Europe) Ltd./Minotaur Music Ltd./Sony Music Publishing (UK) Ltd.

Except
"Make Me Smile (Come Up And See Me)" 
Written by: Steve Harley
Published by: Rak Publishing Ltd.
"Ave Maria"
Written by: Bach/Gounod
Arranged by: Erasure
Published by: Musical Moments (Europe) Ltd./Minotaur Music Ltd./Sony Music Publishing (UK) Ltd.
"Rapture"
Written by: Chris Stein / Deborah Harry
Published by: Rare Blue Music Inc /Monster Island Music Publishing
"Who Needs Love Like That"
Written by: Clarke
Published by: Musical Moments (Europe) Ltd./Sony Music Publishing (UK) Ltd.

Erasure live albums
Music in Cologne